Albert Diaz or Alberto Diaz may refer to:
Albert Diaz (judge) (born 1960), U.S. federal judge from North Carolina
Alberto Díaz Jr. (born 1943), U.S. Navy rear admiral
Albert Rivera Diaz, Spanish lawyer and politician
Alberto Díaz Gutiérrez (Alberto Korda), Cuban photographer
Alberto Cabero Díaz, Chilean politician
Albert "Tiger" Diaz, founding member of La Sombra
 Alberto Díaz, Spanish basketball player